For the Fans may refer to:

 For the Fans (Backstreet Boys album)
 For the Fans Vol. 1, a mini-album by Bizzy Bone
 For the Fans Tour, a concert tour by Gary Barlow
 For the Fans (TV network), the former Eleven Sports USA
 "For the Fans", a track from the soundtrack of the 2015 video game Undertale by Toby Fox